Wild Burma: Nature's Lost Kingdom is a British documentary television series that first broadcast on BBC Two on 29 November 2013. The three-part series explores Myanmar's forests. The filmmakers are Gordon Buchanan, Ross Piper and Justine Evans. The scientists for the series are Chris Wemmer, Darrin Lunde, Khyne U Mar, Kristofer Helgen and Nicole Edmison.

Production
The series was produced by Susanna Handslip and executive produced by Tim Scoones and Tim Martin. The BBC Natural History Unit and the Smithsonian Institution scientists worked together to explore the jungle.

Episode list

Reception

Ratings
According to overnight viewing figures, the first episode had an 8.3% audience share, with 1.91 million viewers. The second and third episodes had audience shares of 8%.

References

External links
 
 

2013 British television series debuts
2013 British television series endings
BBC television documentaries
English-language television shows